Larkman Nunatak is a large, isolated rock nunatak,  high, at the southeast end of the Grosvenor Mountains of Antarctica,  east of Mauger Nunatak. It was named by the New Zealand Geological Survey Antarctic Expedition (1961–62) for a chief engineer of Ernest Shackleton's Imperial Trans-Antarctic Expedition (1914–17) from Australia to the Ross Sea.

References

Nunataks of the Ross Dependency
Dufek Coast